General Martin may refer to:

Alfred Martin (Indian Army officer) (1853–1926), British Indian Army lieutenant general
Augustus Pearl Martin (1835–1902), Massachusetts Militia brigadier general
Charles Martin (Oregon politician) (1863–1946), U.S. Army major general
Charles Irving Martin (1871–1953), U.S. Army major general
Claude Martin (1735–1800), British East India Company major general
Corey Martin (fl. 1990s–2020s), U.S. Air Force major general 
Donna W. Martin (fl. 1980s–2020s), U.S. Army major general 
Edward Fowell Martin (1875–1950), Australian Army brigadier general
Frederick Martin (general) (1882–1954), U.S. Army Air Force major general 
Glen W. Martin (1916–1994), U.S. Air Force lieutenant general
Gregg F. Martin (born 1956), U.S. Army major general
Gregory S. Martin (born 1948), U.S. Air Force general
J. S. S. Martin (1888–1973), Indian Medical Service major general
Jack Martin (basketball) (1922–2015), Texas Air National Guard brigadier general
James Fitzgerald Martin (1876–1958), British Army major general
James Green Martin (1819–1878), Confederate States Army brigadier general
John L. Martin Jr. (1920–2009), U.S. Air Force major general
John Donelson Martin (1830–1862), Confederate States Army acting brigadier general
Joseph Martin (general) (1740–1808), Virginia Militia brigadier general in the American Revolutionary War
Joseph M. Martin (born 1962), U.S. Army general
Kalfie Martin (1910–2000), South African Air Force lieutenant general
Maurice Martin (general) (1878–1952) French Army general
Michael E. Martin (fl. 1990s–2020s), U.S. Air Force major general 
Thaddeus J. Martin (born 1956), U.S. Air Force major general 
Theodore D. Martin (born 1960), U.S. Army lieutenant general
William Franklin Martin (1863–1942), U.S. Army brigadier general
William T. Martin (1823—1910), Confederate States Army major general

See also
Mark S. Martins (born c. 1960), U.S. Army brigadier general
Attorney General Martin (disambiguation)